Live at the Howard Theatre is a live album by the P-Funk spin-off act, the Brides of Funkenstein. The album was recorded on November 1 and 2, 1978, at the Howard Theatre in Washington D.C. The album was released by P-Vine Records in Japan on October 25, 1994, Sequel Records in the UK, and AEM Records in the U.S.  The album was produced by George Clinton for Black Dog Records and A Scoop of Poop productions.

Track listing
"Introduction"
"War Ship Touchante" (Archie Ivy, Bernie Worrell, George Clinton)
"Birdie" (Garry Shider, George Clinton, Rodney Curtis, Ron Dunbar)
"Ride On" (Bernie Worrell, William Collins, George Clinton)
"Brides Maids" (George Clinton)
"Vanish in Our Sleep" (William Collins)
"Together" (Bernie Worrell, William Collins, George Clinton)
"Disco to Go" (William Collins, George Clinton)
"Comedic monologue: James Wesley Jackson"

Personnel
Vocals: Lynn Mabry and Dawn Silva
Drums: Frankie Kash Waddy
Keyboards: Joel "Razor Sharp" Johnson
Horns: Maceo Parker, Richard "Kush" Griffith, Rick Gardner
Bass: Jeff Bunn
Guitars: DeWayne "Blackbyrd" McKnight
Narrator "Funkamedian": James Wesley Jackson

The Brides of Funkenstein albums
1994 live albums